Chusaris idaeoides is a moth of the family Noctuidae described by George Hampson in 1891. It is found in Sri Lanka.

References

Moths of Asia
Moths described in 1891